Swim Little Fish Swim is a 2013 French-American indie comedy-drama written, produced and co-directed by Lola Bessis and Ruben Amar.

This film was shot in New York on a shoe-string budget. Once finished, it hit the festival circuit (Rotterdam; São Paulo; Jerusalem; Durban; CPH:PIX) after premiering at South by Southwest (SXSW) in 2013. Swim Little Fish Swim enjoyed a worldwide theatrical release and it has recently been sold to HBO Europe, Netflix, RTBF and OCS among other international networks.

Cast 
 Dustin Guy Defa as Leeward
 Brooke Bloom as Mary
 Lola Bessis as Lilas
 Olivia Durling Costello as Maggie
 Anne Consigny as Françoise de Castillon

Critical reception 
 "Refreshingly free of cliches." - The Hollywood Reporter
 Indiewire's Eric Kohn praised the film, describing it as "a gentle NYC delight" and giving it a B+ grade.
 "An elegance of construction scarcely seen in like-minded indie comedies." - MTV
 "Featuring gorgeous photography, solid performances and an absolutely killer soundtrack." - CriterionCast
 "What comes through strongest is its Woody Allen-esque treatment of Brooklyn, complete with golden light, beautiful young women, glamorous locations and plenty of appealingly tortured—or insufferably neurotic, depending on your point of view—artists." - Slant Magazine
 "Inspired by John Cassavettes and the Nouvelle Vague's observations of human beings and Jacques Demy's charming atmosphere." The Red List

References

External links
 

2013 films
2013 comedy-drama films
American comedy-drama films
American independent films
2010s French-language films
Films set in New York City
Films shot in New York City
French comedy-drama films
2013 independent films
2010s English-language films
2010s American films
2010s French films